The history of Åland can be traced back to when Humans first reached the archipelago in the Neolithic period ca. 4000BC.

Geology and prehistory

Paleolithic period
Around 18,000BC, during the Weichselian glaciation, a thick cover of ice stretched over Scandinavia, which eventually receded from the islands around 9000BC. Around 8000BC the highest peaks of the then submerged archipelago rose from the Baltic Sea. The sea levels would alternate in the Baltic Sea, but a land bridge to Åland never formed, indicating the first humans came by boat or over the ice.

Due to the forebulge effect after the icecaps melted, the area around Åland is still rising several millimeters per year, marginally expanding the archipelago's surface.

Neolithic period

Artifacts of human remains, pottery and animal bones were found dating as far back as the Middle Neolithic (ca. 4000BC). These are the oldest findings, denoting human presence on the isles by then. Their cultures were Scandinavian, firstly the Pitted Ware culture and  later joined by the Comb Ceramic culture.

Chronology until 1809 
 12th century: Åland Islands might have been occupied by Eric the Saint, other sources claim Åland was already an integral part of Sweden.
 1324: Finland (including the islands) constituted a duchy.
 1300–1600: Kastelholm Castle was a focal point for a number of battles and raids.
 1324: Peace of Nöteborg. Finland and the islands incorporated in Sweden.
 1397–1523: Union of Kalmar: Danish ascendency.
 1581: Finland a Grand Duchy.
 1634: Swedish Constitution. The islands formed part of the Government of Åbo (Finland)
 1714: The Islands are conquered by Peter the Great.
 1714–1721: Åland was attacked and devastated by Peter the Great's forces; most of the population then fled to Sweden.
 1721: Peace of Nystad. Finland (except Vyborg) is restored to Sweden.
 1743: Peace of Åbo: part of Finland is ceded to Russia.
 1808: Finnish War between Sweden and Russia.
 1809 September – Treaty of Fredrikshamn: Finland and the islands are ceded to Russia.

Continuing malaria outbreaks
As the result of abundant Anopheles claviger mosquitoes, malaria was endemic in Åland for at least 150 years, with severe outbreaks being recorded in the 18th century, and in 1853 and 1862.

Chronology up to 1919

 c. 1835: Fortress of Bomarsund begins construction.
 1853: Severe malaria outbreak.
 1854 – Battle of Bomarsund: as part of the Crimean War the Anglo-French invasion of Åland takes place. The coalition force attacks and destroys the fortress of Bomarsund. The British prime minister Palmerston had protested against this fortification some twenty years prior, without effect.
 1856  – Treaty of Paris: The peace convention forbids the fortification of the Islands.
 March 1856: By the Åland Convention, concluded between the United Kingdom, France and Russia, it was decided the isles were demilitarized.
 1862: Another severe malaria outbreak occurs.
 1877: A telegraph cable is in use from Mariehamn to Nystad.
 1892: The first telephone is installed in Mariehamn.
 1906: A Russian garrison is established in the Islands. Some attention went to the earlier Treaty of Paris when Russia, under pretext of stopping the smuggling of arms into Finland, placed considerable naval and military forces on the islands.
 1907: Russia requests France and Great Britain to cancel the Convention's agreement.
 1907: Secret Treaty of Björkö (Russia and Germany), which gives Russia a free hand to install military forces on the Islands.
 1914: Outbreak of World War I: Russia fortifies the Islands.
 1916: The islands are remilitarised by Russia and used as a submarine base during World War I.
 1917 – Russian Revolution: Finland declares independence. The Islanders demand reunification with Sweden via a referendum (25–29 December). 
 1918: The Soviet Government, Sweden and Germany recognise Finland's independence Sweden, and Germany. Bolshevik forces, however, land on the Islands as part of the Russian Revolution. The isles are later invaded by Sweden (February) and eventually occupied by Germany (March-October).
 1918: The islanders internationally plead to reunite with Sweden.
 1919: Sweden brings the question before the Paris Peace Conference on 18 March but the islands remain part of Finland.
 1921: The Åland convention re-establishes the demilitarised status of the islands.

See also
 History of Finland

References

External links 
 

 
Aland